Trouble in Store is a 1953 British comedy film directed by John Paddy Carstairs and starring Norman Wisdom as a department store clerk in his cinema debut. The film also featured Moira Lister, Margaret Rutherford, Jerry Desmonde and Lana Morris. For his performance, Wisdom won a BAFTA Award for Most Promising Newcomer. Although it was shown at a West End venue, the film broke box office records at 51 out of the 67 London cinemas in which it played. The film was shot at Pinewood Studios with sets designed by the art director Alex Vetchinsky. It was released by Rank's General Film Distributors and was later released in America by Republic Pictures. The film's success led to Wisdom appearing in a string of films for Rank beginning with One Good Turn.

Plot
Norman (Norman Wisdom), a lowly stock clerk at Burridge's department store, is in love with another employee, Sally Wilson (Lana Morris), though he has been unable to muster the courage to let her know how he feels. After he antagonizes the new head of the store, Augustus Freeman (Jerry Desmonde), he is promptly fired. On his way out, Norman helps Miss Bacon (Margaret Rutherford) carry her bulging suitcases, unaware that she is an audacious shoplifter. Freeman sees Norman assisting a "customer" and rehires him.

Meanwhile, Peggy Drew (Moira Lister), the store's personnel manager, flirts with Mr. Freeman,  while plotting with her boyfriend Gerald (Derek Bond) to rob the place. Norman is fired and rehired again and again, as his escapades somehow manage to benefit the store. He also finally becomes acquainted with Sally, chasing her down through the city streets to return her handbag. His antics make her laugh.

After his latest firing, Norman is alarmed to find the handsome, suave Gerald trying to get to know Sally better. When he goes to the man's apartment to warn him to stay away from her, Norman inadvertently uncovers the robbery plot, scheduled to coincide with a big sale the next day. But,  he is unable to get Sally or anyone else to take him seriously.

Sally eventually decides to bring Norman's story to the attention of the management, but tells the wrong person, Miss Drew, and is tied up for her efforts. Norman finds her and together, they foil the thieves. Freeman takes Norman back into his employ...but not for long.

Cast
Norman Wisdom as Norman
Lana Morris as Sally Wilson
Moira Lister as Peggy Drew
Jerry Desmonde as Augustus Freeman
Derek Bond as Gerald
Margaret Rutherford as Miss Bacon the shoplifter
Megs Jenkins as Miss Gibson, Norman's loyal friend in the stockroom
Michael Brennan as Davis
Michael Ward as Wilbur
Joan Sims as Edna
 Eddie Leslie as Bill
 Joan Ingram as Miss Denby
 Cyril Chamberlain as 	Alf
 Ronan O'Casey as Eddie
 Roddy Hughes as Taffy 
	Graham Tonbridge as 	Mr. Graham - Department Head 
Esma Cannon as Woman at cafe

Production
Earl St John saw Norman Wisdom on television and signed him to Rank on a seven year contract. However an initial screen test between Wisdom and Petula Clark under the direction of Ronald Neame went poorly and Rank tried to get out of the contract but Wisdom and his agent insisted it be honoured. Wisdom says St John then arranged for Jill Craige to write a vehicle specifically for him which she did over six weeks. John Paddy Carstairs became attached as director and worked on the script with Wisdom, who says Ted Willis and producer Maurice Cowan also worked on the script.

Another account says Jill Craigie reportedly asked that her name be removed from the credits after learning of Wisdom's participation.

Reception

Box office
The film was the second most popular at the British box office in 1954.

Critical
The Daily Mirror reviewer wrote of the film: "If you don't laugh at Norman's antics as the downtrodden worker in a big store, trying to get promotion as a window dresser, there is something wrong with your sense of fun".

References

External links
 
 
Review of film at Variety

1953 films
1953 comedy films
British black-and-white films
British comedy films
Films directed by John Paddy Carstairs
Films with screenplays by John Paddy Carstairs
Films set in department stores
Two Cities Films films
Films shot at Pinewood Studios
Films set in London
Films with screenplays by Ted Willis, Baron Willis
1950s English-language films
1950s British films